Erich Siebert (7 May 1910 – 1947) was a German wrestler who competed in the 1936 Summer Olympics. He died in a prison camp following World War II.

References

External links
 

1910 births
1947 deaths
Olympic wrestlers of Germany
Wrestlers at the 1936 Summer Olympics
German male sport wrestlers
Olympic bronze medalists for Germany
Olympic medalists in wrestling
Medalists at the 1936 Summer Olympics
German prisoners of war in World War II held by the Soviet Union
SS personnel
German people who died in Soviet detention
20th-century German people